Dmytro Eduardovych Topalov (born 12 March 1998) is a Ukrainian professional footballer who plays as a midfielder for Shakhtar Donetsk in the Ukrainian Premier League.

Career
Born in Volnovakha Raion, Donetsk Oblast, Topalov trained in the Shakhtar Donetsk youth academy beginning at age 8.

He made his debut for FC Mariupol in the Ukrainian Premier League as a second-half substitute against FC Kolos Kovalivka on 30 July 2019.

References

External links
 
 
 

1998 births
Living people
Ukrainian footballers
FC Shakhtar Donetsk players
FC Mariupol players
Ukrainian Premier League players
Association football midfielders
Ukraine youth international footballers
Ukraine under-21 international footballers
Sportspeople from Donetsk Oblast